Harry Witt (born 29 August 1954) is a German former professional football player, who played as a forward, and later manager. He is currently the sports director for FC Kilia Kiel, which plays in the Schleswig-Holstein-Liga.

References

1954 births
Living people
German footballers
Association football forwards
Holstein Kiel players
FC Viktoria Köln players
SG Union Solingen players
2. Bundesliga players
German football managers
Holstein Kiel managers